Marechal Deodoro is a municipality and an important tourist center of Alagoas, Brazil. Its population is 52,380 (2020) and its area is 334 km². The town was the first capital of Alagoas state.

History 
The city was founded as Vila Madalena in 1611, and features a number of historical buildings from the colonial period. It was also referred to as Alagoas, or the City of Alagoas. The first president of the Republic of Brazil, Marshal Deodoro da Fonseca, was born in Vila Madalena; the city was later renamed in his honour.

Famous inhabitants
 Manuel Deodoro da Fonseca — born in the town
 Aureliano Cândido Tavares Bastos — born in the town

See also
List of National Historic Heritage of Brazil — three sites in Marechal Deodoro are listed

References

Populated coastal places in Alagoas
Populated places established in 1611
Municipalities in Alagoas